Joshua Damon Hill (born 9 January 1991) is a British former racing driver from Surrey, England. He is the son of 1996 Formula One world champion Damon Hill and the grandson of two-time Formula One world champion Graham Hill.

Career
Hill has been racing cars since 2008. He debuted in the 2010 Formula Renault UK Winter Championship with Manor Competition, finishing in 9th position.

After seasons in the British Ginetta and Formula Ford championships, he competed in the Toyota Racing Series, a Formula 3 style open wheel racing series run in New Zealand during the European winter. In 2011 he competed in the British Formula Renault Championship, taking his maiden win in the November Finals.

In 2012 Hill raced in Formula Renault 2.0 NEC championship, finishing third overall and taking five wins.

On 9 July 2013 Hill announced his retirement from motor racing.

Racing record

Complete FIA European Formula 3 Championship results
(key)

References

External links
 Farnham's Josh Hill eyes Formula Ford Festival victory - BBC Motorsport
 Hill masters the rain at Donington - The Checkered Flag

1991 births
Living people
British Formula Renault 2.0 drivers
British racing drivers
FIA Formula 3 European Championship drivers
Formula Ford drivers
Formula Renault 2.0 NEC drivers
MRF Challenge Formula 2000 Championship drivers
Sportspeople from Surrey
Toyota Racing Series drivers
Ginetta Junior Championship drivers
Manor Motorsport drivers
KTR drivers
Fortec Motorsport drivers